Selle Royal Spa is a company from Vicenza, Italy, founded in 1956 by Riccardo Bigolin, producing saddles for bicycles. In 1965, a formal establishment of Selle Royal Sp.A. was made in Vicenza for the production and distribution of bicycle saddles. Polyurethane foaming production system was chosen in order to be able to maximize production across the chain. Selle Royal then released the first patent of vacuum technology for ergonomic shaped design production. 

In the 90's, Selle Royal Sp.A. developed and patented a revolutionary "soft-solid" material named as Royalgel. Royalgel claims to be the only saddle gel that doesn't age, harden, or migrate, delivering unbeatable comfort and durability. 

With the 2010 acquisition of China's Justek, Selle Royal Spa was stated to be the world's largest manufacturer of bicycle saddles.

History 

 1956: Riccardo Bigolin founded Selle Royal
 1970: Selle Royal develops a production technology based on a particular polyurethane foam
 1980s - 1990s: Selle Royal Spa has become a partner of the main houses that produce bicycles.
 1980: Selle Royal develops the RVS , an automated vacuum production system, which allows the saddle to be joined directly to the foam
 1990: Selle Royal develops a gel for the saddle for the recreational market, based on an exclusive polyurethane gel patented by Bayer
 1996: Selle Royal opens Selle Bra for production in Brazil
 1997: Selle Royal launches Fi'zi:k
 2002: Selle Royal acquires Brooks England, thus giving the company three independent brands of saddles
 2005: Selle Bra and Metal Ciclo merge to form Royal Ciclo
 2006 - 2010: Selle Royal began direct distribution through dealers H2 (USA) with Continental Tyres and A4, (Italy and France, Austria since 2018) of proprietary and thirdy brands.
 2007: Selle Royal acquires Crankbrothers
 2010: Selle Royal acquires 52% of Justek, China
 2011: Selle Royal acquired PEdAL ED, operating under Via Vittorio Emanuele 119 - 36050 Pozzoleone (VI), ITALY - P.IVA. 04013940244 since 2016
 2013: Brooks England purchased Pannier ltd.
 2015: Justek became Selle Royal China Vehicle, with two production sites (Jiangyin and Tianjin)
 2016: Opening of SR56 Inc, a R&D Center in Ogden, Utah

See also 

 List of bicycle parts
 List of Italian companies

References

External links

 Selle Royal Corporate Website

Italian brands
Sporting goods manufacturers of Italy
Bicycle saddle makers
Manufacturing companies established in 1956
Companies based in Veneto
2002 mergers and acquisitions
2007 mergers and acquisitions
Italian companies established in 1956
Multinational companies headquartered in Italy